The Chukotka Mountains or Chukotka Upland (Чукотская горная страна) is a mountainous area in the Chukotka Autonomous Okrug, Far Eastern Federal District, Russia.

The ridges of this system are largely barren and desolate. About half of their area is above the Arctic Circle. The climate is one of the harshest in the Russian Federation, with minimum absolute temperatures reaching -73°С. Traditionally Chukchi people lived only in few intermontane areas, such as the Amguema valley that cuts across the vast mountain zone.

Geography
The Chukotka Mountains are one of the two main mountain regions of Chukotka. They rise west and east of the isthmus area of the Chukchi Peninsula, in the central Chukotka region, bounded by the Anadyr Highlands in the southwest. They are composed of mountains of middle height displaying alpine relief, as well as low mountains. The ranges of the northern area consist of sandstone and shale with granite intrusions, while those of the southern part are made up of volcanic rocks.

Hydrography
Among the rivers that have their source in the mountains, the following deserve mention: the Amguema River with its tributaries Ekityki and Chantalveergyn, the Palyavaam, Pegtymel and Tanyurer of the Chukchi Sea side, as well as the Kanchalan and the Belaya River tributaries Bolshoi Pykarvaam and Bolshaya Osinovaya of the Pacific Ocean side. The largest lakes in the mountain area are Ekityki, Ioni and Koolen.

Subranges
The system of the Chukotka Mountains comprises a number of subranges, including the following:

Shelag Range, highest point  — the northwesternmost, reaching up to Cape Shelagsky.
Ichuveem Range, highest point .
Ekvyvatap Range, highest point .
Pegtymel Range, highest point .
Palyavaam Range, highest point .
Chantal Range, highest point .
Ekityk Range, highest point .
Pekulney Range, highest point .
Iskaten Range, highest point .
Ghenkanyi Range, highest point  — the easternmost, near the Bering Sea.

Climate
The climate of the Chukotka Mountains area is severe, with short cool summers and very cold 8-month long winters where blizzards are common owing to the influence of both the Arctic Ocean and the Aleutian Low. The valley areas have a continental climate while the mountain ranges are under the influence of an oceanic climate, which is felt more in the lower altitude mountains and less in the medium-high ones.

Flora and fauna
The lower slopes of the mountains have tundra vegetation, often marshy in the intermontane basins, while the higher altitudes are Arctic desert. Rivers are abundant in fish.

References

External links

Geography of Chukotka Autonomous Okrug
Geology of Chukotka
 
East Siberian Mountains